The Jammu and Kashmir Workers Party (JKWP) is an Indian political party led by Mir Junaid in the Union Territory of Jammu and Kashmir. The party supports the 2019 move to render Article 370 and 35a of the constitution of India inoperative.

See also
Bharatiya Janata Party
Ikkjutt Jammu
Jammu and Kashmir Apni Party

References

External links
Jammu and Kashmir Workers Party on Facebook
Jammu and Kashmir Workers Party on Twitter

Political parties in Jammu and Kashmir
Jammu and Kashmir politicians
Jammu and Kashmir Workers Party
2020 establishments in Jammu and Kashmir